Suicide Hill Ski Jump is a 90-meter ski jump located in Negaunee, Michigan, and is part of the Ishpeming Ski Club.  It is one of three major ski jumps located in the Upper Peninsula of Michigan (the others being Copper Peak (a larger ski flying hill) and Pine Mountain Ski Jump).  Suicide Hill has been in existence since 1925.  Suicide Hill Ski Jump is located in a small valley known as Suicide Bowl. Suicide Bowl contains a total of five jumps:  a 13-meter, 25-meter, 40-meter, 60-meter, and Suicide Hill at 90-meters.  The 13-meter and 40-meter jumps are fitted with plastic for summer jumping. All five jumps are used during winter.  Suicide Bowl also contains cross-country ski runs.

Specifications

HS 96 
Scaffold Height: 140 ft
Hill Size: HS 96
K-point: 90 meters
Angle of take-off: 11.5 degrees
Landing angle: 36.5 degrees
Year of construction: 1925

HS 66 
Hill Size: HS 66
K-point: 60 meters
Year of Construction: 1925

History
Before the construction of the jump in 1925, numerous other hills and jumps were used for competitions. The first competition that took place in Ishpeming, Michigan was on February 25, 1882.  Since 1887, an annual competition has taken place in the area.  On February 26, 1926, Suicide Hill was opened for its first competition.  The name "Suicide Hill" was given by a local newspaper reporter named Ted Butler after jumper Walter "Huns" Anderson was injured in 1926. Due to this long history of ski jumping in the area, the National Ski Hall of Fame is located in Ishpeming.

Current records
For the HS 96: 2003/03/02 102m Ferdinand Bader Germany
For the HS 66: 2008/03/01 69.5m Adam Loomis United States

List of Events Held
February 26, 1926
February 8, 2012
February 6, 2013
February 5, 2014
January 27, 2015
January 18, 2022
January 20, 2023

Notes

Further reading

Buildings and structures in Marquette County, Michigan
Ski jumping venues in the United States
Sports venues in Michigan
Ski areas and resorts in Michigan
Ski jumping venues in Michigan
1925 establishments in Michigan
Tourist attractions in Marquette County, Michigan